Ricardo Fernández Tio (born 5 January 1976 in Castellón) is a B1 classified goalball athlete from Spain. He played goalball at the 1996 Summer Paralympics. His team was third.  He played goalball at the 2000 Summer Paralympics. His team was third.

References 

Living people
1976 births
Paralympic bronze medalists for Spain
Goalball players at the 1996 Summer Paralympics
Goalball players at the 2000 Summer Paralympics
People from Valencia
Medalists at the 1996 Summer Paralympics
Medalists at the 2000 Summer Paralympics
Paralympic goalball players of Spain
Paralympic medalists in goalball